The Colorado Springs School District 11 (District 11 or D-11) is the central school district of Colorado Springs, Colorado. Its headquarters are in that city.

History 
The first school in Colorado Springs was organized by Mary Mellen "Queen" Palmer, wife of city founder William Jackson Palmer, in late 1871. Classes were first held in a home on the northeast corner of Cascade Avenue and Bijou Street, rented by Mrs. Palmer for the school. School District 11 was established in August 1872. The district enrollment passed 1000 by 1883 and stood at 1776 on opening day of the Colorado Springs High School building in 1893. (That building was razed in 1938 to make way for construction of Palmer High School.)

In 1919, the school districts of Colorado City (annexed by Colorado Springs in 1917) and Colorado Springs were consolidated. The district saw modest growth between 1920 and 1940, then a large boom following World War II.

List of schools

Elementary schools

Adams Elementary School
Audubon Elementary School
Bristol Elementary School
Buena Vista Montessori 
Carver Elementary School
Chipeta Elementary School
Columbia Elementary School
Edison Elementary School
Freedom Elementary School
Fremont Elementary School
Grant Elementary School
Henry Elementary School
Howbert Elementary School 
Jackson Elementary School
Keller Elementary School
King Elementary School
Madison Elementary School
Martinez Elementary School
McAuliffe Elementary School
Midland Elementary School
Monroe Elementary School
Penrose Elementary School
Queen Palmer Elementary School
Rogers Elementary School
Rudy Elementary School
Scott Elementary School
Steele Elementary School
Stratton Elementary School
Taylor Elementary School
Trailblazer Elementary School
Twain Elementary School
West Elementary School
Wilson Elementary School

Middle schools
Galileo School of Math and Science (converted from the former East Middle School)
Holmes Middle School
Jenkins Middle School 
Mann Middle School
North Middle School
Russell Middle School
Sabin Middle School
Swigert Aerospace Academy (formerly Emerson-Edison Charter Academy)
West Middle School

High schools
Coronado High School
Doherty High School
Mitchell High School
Palmer High School

Charter schools
 Academy for Advanced and Creative Learning
 CIVA Charter High School
 Community Prep
 East Lake High School
 GLOBE Charter School
 Roosevelt Charter Academy

Alternative schools
Achieve Online School
Adult and Family Education
Bijou School
Career Pathways
Digital High School
Odyssey Early College and Career Options
Roy J. Wasson Academic Center (formerly Wasson High School)
Tesla Educational Opportunity School

Closed
Bates Elementary School
Franklin Elementary School
Hunt Elementary School
Irving Middle School
Ivywild Elementary School 
Jefferson Elementary School
Lincoln Elementary School
Longfellow Elementary School 
Pike Elementary School
Wasson High School
South Middle School (demolished) 
Washington Elementary School 
Whittier Elementary School

Board of Education Members 
 President Dr. Parth Melpakam 
- Elected 2019 - 2023

- Treasurer 2019 - 2021

- President 2021 - 2023

 Vice President Jason Jorgenson
- Elected 2019 - 2023

- Vice President 2021 - 2023

 Secretary Dr. Sandra Bankes
- Elected 2021 - 2025

- Secretary 2021 - 2023

 Treasurer Lauren Nelson
- Elected 2021 - 2025

- Treasurer 2021 - 2023

 Director Darleen Daniels
- Elected 2019 - 2023

 Director Reverend Al Loma
- Elected 2021 - 2023

 Director Julie Ott
- Elected 2017 - 2021

- Re-Elected 2021 - 2025

- Vice President 2019 - 2021

- Treasurer 2017 - 2019

See also

List of school districts in Colorado

References

External links
 

School districts in Colorado
Education in Colorado Springs, Colorado
School districts established in 1919
1919 establishments in Colorado